İbrahim Çelikkol (born February 14, 1982) is a Turkish TV series and film actor, former player of The Turkey national under-20 basketball team and fashion model.

Life and career 
His maternal family is of Turkish origin who immigrated from Thessaloniki, Ottoman Empire (now, Greece). His paternal family is of Arab descent.

His father was a football player. When he died, İbrahim Çelikkol left basketball. His family is generally sportsmen and musicians. He has a sister named Aslı Çelikkol.

Çelikkol worked as a professional model before he started acting. When he met Osman Sınav, a Turkish film producer, he started acting. His first part was Şamil in Pars: Narkoterör. He played Ulubatlı Hasan in Fetih 1453.

Filmography

Film

Web series

Television

References

External links

1982 births
Turkish male film actors
Living people
Turkish male television actors
Male actors from Izmit
Turkish people of Arab descent